The men's rings competition was one of eight events for male competitors in artistic gymnastics at the 1992 Summer Olympics in Barcelona. The qualification and final rounds took place on July 27, 29 and August 2 at the Palau dels Esports de Barcelona. There were 93 competitors from 25 nations, with nations in the team event having 6 gymnasts while other nations could have up to 3 gymnasts. The event was won by Vitaly Scherbo of the Unified Team, the fourth time in five Games that a Soviet or former Soviet gymnast won the rings. Li Jing of China earned silver. There was a tie for third, with Andreas Wecker of Germany and Li Xiaoshuang of China each receiving bronze medals. It was the first medal for unified Germany since 1936, though East Germany had won gold and bronze in 1988.

Background

This was the 18th appearance of the event, which is one of the five apparatus events held every time there were apparatus events at the Summer Olympics (no apparatus events were held in 1900, 1908, 1912, or 1920). Two of the eight finalists from 1988 returned: bronze medalist Sven Tippelt of East Germany and fourth-place finisher Kalofer Khristozov of Bulgaria. The reigning (1991) world champion was Grigory Misutin of the Unified Team. Wecker had placed second in both 1989 and 1991.

Puerto Rico and Slovenia each made their debut in the men's rings; some former Soviet Republics competed as the Unified Team. The United States made its 16th appearance, most of any nation; the Americans had missed only the inaugural 1896 rings and the boycotted 1980 Games.

Competition format

Each nation entered a team of six gymnasts or up to three individual gymnasts. All entrants in the gymnastics competitions performed both a compulsory exercise and a voluntary exercise for each apparatus. The scores for all 12 exercises were summed to give an individual all-around score. These exercise scores were also used for qualification for the apparatus finals. The two exercises (compulsory and voluntary) for each apparatus were summed to give an apparatus score. The top eight gymnasts, with a limit of two per nation, advanced to the final. In a change from previous years, the preliminary score had no effect on the final; once the eight finalists were selected, their ranking depended only on the final exercise. Non-finalists were ranked 9th through 93rd based on preliminary score.

Schedule

All times are Central European Summer Time (UTC+2)

Results

References

Official Olympic Report
www.gymnasticsresults.com

Men's rings
Men's 1992
Men's events at the 1992 Summer Olympics